Acrobasis xanthogramma is a species of snout moth in the genus Acrobasis. It was described by Staudinger in 1870. It is endemic to Spain, North Africa and Jordan.

References

Acrobasis
Moths described in 1870
Moths of Europe
Moths of Africa
Moths of Asia
Taxa named by Otto Staudinger